Abdu Ali Abdul Rahman is a Yemeni diplomat who was Ambassador to Pakistan in Islamabad. He quit his position as Ambassador to Pakistan over the 2011 Yemeni uprising.

References

Yemeni diplomats
Ambassadors of Yemen to Pakistan
Living people
Year of birth missing (living people)
Place of birth missing (living people)
21st-century Yemeni politicians